

This is a list of the National Register of Historic Places listings in Stark County, Ohio.

This is intended to be a complete list of the properties and districts on the National Register of Historic Places in Stark County, Ohio, United States. Latitude and longitude coordinates are provided for many National Register properties and districts; these locations may be seen together in an online map.

There are 90 properties and districts listed on the National Register in the county, including 1 National Historic Landmark. Another 3 properties were once listed but have been removed.

Current listings

|}

Former listings

|}

See also

 List of National Historic Landmarks in Ohio
 Listings in neighboring counties: Carroll, Columbiana, Holmes, Mahoning, Portage, Summit, Tuscarawas, Wayne
 National Register of Historic Places listings in Ohio

References

 
Stark